Iothia fulva is a species of sea snail, a true limpet, a marine gastropod mollusk in the family Lepetidae, one of the families of true limpets.

Distribution
This marine species occurs on the Galicia Bank (Northeast Atlantic Ocean).

References

External links
  Serge GOFAS, Ángel A. LUQUE, Joan Daniel OLIVER,José TEMPLADO & Alberto SERRA (2021) - The Mollusca of Galicia Bank (NE Atlantic Ocean); European Journal of Taxonomy 785: 1–114

Lepetidae
Gastropods described in 1776
Taxa named by Otto Friedrich Müller